Bret Louis Stephens (born November 21, 1973) is an American conservative journalist, editor, and columnist. He began working as an opinion columnist for The New York Times in April 2017 and as a senior contributor to NBC News in June 2017.

Stephens previously worked for The Wall Street Journal as a foreign-affairs columnist and later as the deputy editorial page editor, and was responsible for the editorial pages of its European and Asian editions.

From 2002 to 2004, he was editor-in-chief of The Jerusalem Post. He won the Pulitzer Prize for Commentary in 2013.

Stephens is known for his neoconservative foreign policy opinions and for being part of the right-of-center opposition to Donald Trump.

Biography
Stephens was born in New York City, the son of Xenia and Charles J. Stephens, a former vice president of General Products, a chemical company in Mexico. Both his parents were secular Jews. His mother was born in Italy at the start of World War II to Jewish parents who had fled Nazi Germany. His paternal grandfather, Louis Ehrlich, was born in 1901 in  Kishinev (today Chișinău, Moldova). He fled with his family to New York after the Kishinev pogrom and changed the family surname to Stephens (after poet James Stephens). Louis Stephens moved to Mexico City, where he founded General Products and built his fortune. He married Annette Margolis and had two sons, Charles and Luis. Charles married Xenia. They moved to Mexico City with their newborn son, Bret, to help run the chemical company, inherited from Louis. Bret was raised there and is fluent in Spanish. As a teenager, he attended boarding school at Middlesex School in Concord, Massachusetts.

Stephens earned an undergraduate degree in political philosophy from the University of Chicago. He then earned a master's degree in comparative politics at the London School of Economics.

He is married to Corinna da Fonseca-Wollheim, a New York Times music critic. They have three children, and live in New York City. He was previously married to Pamela Paul, the former editor of The New York Times Book Review.

Journalism career

Stephens began his career as an assistant editor at Commentary magazine in 1995–96. 

In 1998 he joined The Wall Street Journal as an op-ed editor. He later worked as an editorial writer for The Wall Street Journal Europe, in Brussels. Stephens edited the weekly "State of the Union" column on the European Union.

In 2002, Stephens moved to Israel to become the editor-in-chief of The Jerusalem Post. He was 28 years old. Haaretz reported at the time that the appointment of Stephens, a non-Israeli, triggered some unease among senior Jerusalem Post management and staff. Stephens said that one of the reasons he left The Wall Street Journal for The Jerusalem Post was that he believed that Western media was getting Israel's story wrong. "I do not think Israel is the aggressor here", he said. "Insofar as getting the story right helps Israel, I guess you could say I'm trying to help Israel." Stephens led The Jerusalem Post during the worst years of the Palestinian campaign of suicide bombings against Israel and pointed the paper in a more neoconservative direction. In 2003, The Jerusalem Post named Deputy Secretary of Defense Paul Wolfowitz, an architect of the Iraq War, its Man of the Year. 

Stephens left The Jerusalem Post in 2004 and returned to The Wall Street Journal. In 2006, he took over the Journals "Global View" column after George Melloan's retirement.

In 2017, Stephens left the Journal, joined The New York Times as an opinion columnist, and began appearing as an on-air contributor to NBC News and MSNBC.

In 2021, Stephens became editor-in-chief of SAPIR: A Journal of Jewish Conversations, published by Maimonides Fund.

Awards and recognition
In 2005, the World Economic Forum named Stephens a Young Global Leader. He won the 2008 Eric Breindel Award for Excellence in Opinion Journalism. In 2009, he was named deputy editorial page editor after Melanie Kirkpatrick's retirement. In 2010, Stephens won the Reason Foundation's Bastiat Prize.

Stephens won the 2013 Pulitzer Prize for Commentary for "his incisive columns on American foreign policy and domestic politics, often enlivened by a contrarian twist." He is a national judge of the Livingston Award. In 2015, Stephens joined the Real-Time Academy of Short Form Arts & Sciences. The Real-Time Academy judges contestants for the Shorty Awards, which honor the best individuals and organizations on social media.

Stephens has chaired two Pulitzer juries. In 2016, he chaired the one that awarded the Pulitzer Prize for International Reporting to Alyssa Rubin of The New York Times. In 2017, Stephens chaired the jury that awarded the Pulitzer Prize for Editorial Writing to Art Cullen of The Storm Lake Times.

Published works
Stephens's book America in Retreat: The New Isolationism and the Coming Global Disorder was released in November 2014. In it, he argues that the US has been retreating from its role as the "world's policeman" in recent decades, which will lead to ever-greater world problems.

Controversy

Being called a bedbug 
In August 2019, Stephens sent a complaint to a George Washington University (GWU) professor and the university's provost about a tweet in which the professor called Stephens a "bedbug". The topic of Stephens's next column was the "rhetoric of infestation" used by authoritarian regimes such as Nazi Germany. The column was interpreted as criticism of the GWU professor and other critics of Stephens. The controversy went viral online, leading to then-president Donald Trump tweeting, "lightweight journalist Bret Stephens, a Conservative who does anything that his bosses at the paper tell him to do! He is now quitting Twitter after being called a 'bedbug.' Tough guy!" It was also pointed out that in a 2013 Wall Street Journal article, Stephens had called Palestinians "mosquitoes".

Racism accusations
In August 2016, The Wall Street Journal published a column by Stephens about an Egyptian judoka refusing to shake hands with his Israeli opponent after an Olympic match, in which Stephens called antisemitism "the disease of the Arab mind". Some readers criticized this as a racist generalization that all Arabs were antisemitic. After Stephens joined The New York Times, several reporters at the newspaper criticized Stephens's previous writings.

In December 2019, Stephens's column "The Secrets of Jewish Genius", in which he contended that Ashkenazi Jews have superior intelligence, led to accusations of eugenics and racism. The column originally said that "Ashkenazi Jews might have a marginal advantage over their gentile peers when it comes to thinking better. Where their advantage more often lies is in thinking different." Following widespread criticism, The New York Times editors deleted the section of the column in which he appeared to claim that Ashkenazi Jews are genetically superior to other groups. The editors said that Stephens erred in citing an academic study by an author with "racist views" whose 2005 paper advanced a genetic hypothesis for the basis of intelligence among Ashkenazi Jews. The Times's deletion was criticized by Jonathan Haidt, Nadine Strossen, Pamela Paresky and Steven Pinker, who called it "surrender to an outrage mob".

In February 2021, Stephens wrote a column critical of the Times's dismissal of Donald McNeil for using a racial slur against African Americans in the context of a discussion with students of the slur's usage. Six students present on the occasion said that McNeil had used the word "in a way that they perceived as casual, unnecessary or even gratuitous", but one of them added that "McNeil’s opinions didn’t disparage African Americans". The Times spiked the column, but it leaked to the New York Post, which published it. Stephens principally argued against the editor's initial position that the newspaper would "not tolerate racist language regardless of intent"; the editor subsequently backed down from that position.

Views and opinions

Foreign policy
Foreign policy was one of the central subjects of the columns for which Stephens won the Pulitzer Prize for Commentary. His foreign policy opinions have been characterized as neoconservative, part of a right-wing political movement associated with President George W. Bush that advocated the use of military force abroad, particularly in the Middle East, as a way of promoting democracy there. Stephens was a "prominent voice" among the media advocates for the start of the 2003 Iraq War, for instance writing in a 2002 column that, unless checked, Iraq was likely to become the first nuclear power in the Arab world. Although the weapons of mass destruction used as a casus belli were never shown to exist, Stephens continued to insist as late as 2013 that the Bush administration had "solid evidence" for going to war. Stephens has also argued strongly against the Iran nuclear deal and its preliminary agreements, claiming that they were a worse bargain even than the 1938 Munich Agreement with Nazi Germany.

Stephens is a supporter of Israel. He has caused controversy for his remarks referring to an Egyptian athlete's refusal to shake his Israeli Olympic opponent's hand as "the disease of the Arab mind". Stephens claimed this incident exemplifies antisemitism in the Arab world.

Donald Trump
During the 2016 United States presidential election campaign, Stephens became part of the Stop Trump movement, regularly writing articles for The Wall Street Journal opposing Donald Trump's candidacy and becoming "one of Trump’s most outspoken conservative critics". Stephens has compared Trump to Italian dictator Benito Mussolini. After Trump was elected, Stephens continued to oppose him: In February 2017, Stephens gave the Daniel Pearl Memorial Lecture at the University of California, Los Angeles, and used the platform to denounce Trump's attacks on the media. His opposition to Trump continued after he moved to the Times. For instance, in 2018 he argued that by the same logic Republicans used to justify the impeachment of Bill Clinton, they should impeach Trump.

Global warming
Stephens is also known for his climate change contrarianism. He has been described as a climate change denier, but disavows that term, calling himself agnostic on the issue.

Stephens considers climate change a "20-year-old mass hysteria phenomenon" and rejects the notion that greenhouse-gas emissions are an environmental threat. According to him, "it isn't science" and belongs into the "realm of belief" as it is a "sick-souled religion". He also mocks climate change activism as hysterical alarmism, denying that any significant temperature change will occur in the next 100 years and arguing that it distracts from more important issues, such as terrorism. Stephens claims that global warming activism is based on theological beliefs, rather than science, as an outgrowth of Western tendencies to expect punishment for sins. He has also suggested that activists would be more persuasive if they were less sure of their beliefs. Stephens's positions on this issue led to a protest in 2013 over his Pulitzer citation omitting his climate change columns, and to a strong backlash against his 2017 hiring by The New York Times. In reaction, The New York Times praised Stephens's "intellectual honesty and fairness". As of October 28, 2022, Stephens said that he had come to accept the reality of anthropogenic climate change after a trip to Greenland with climate scientist John Englander, although he believes that markets are more effective than government at addressing the problem.

Published works
 America in Retreat: The New Isolationism and the Coming Global Disorder (November 2014), 
 Has Obama Made the World a More Dangerous Place?: The Munk Debate on U.S. Foreign Policy (August 2015), 
 The Dying Art of Disagreement (December 2017),

References

External links

1973 births
20th-century American journalists
20th-century American male writers
20th-century American non-fiction writers
21st-century American journalists
21st-century American male writers
21st-century American non-fiction writers
Alumni of the London School of Economics
American expatriates in Mexico
American foreign policy writers
American male journalists
American male non-fiction writers
American people of Moldovan-Jewish descent
American political commentators
American political writers
American Zionists
Bastiat Prize winners
Jewish American writers
Journalists from New York City
Living people
MSNBC people
Middlesex School alumni
NBC News people
Neoconservatism
Pulitzer Prize for Commentary winners
The Jerusalem Post editors
The New York Times columnists
The Wall Street Journal people
University of Chicago alumni
Writers from New York City